Reinhard Neuner (born 4 February 1969) is an Austrian biathlete. He competed in the men's sprint event at the 1998 Winter Olympics.

References

1969 births
Living people
Austrian male biathletes
Austrian male cross-country skiers
Olympic biathletes of Austria
Olympic cross-country skiers of Austria
Biathletes at the 1998 Winter Olympics
Cross-country skiers at the 2002 Winter Olympics
People from Imst District
Sportspeople from Tyrol (state)
20th-century Austrian people